Federico Borgna (born 19 October 1973 in Cuneo) is an Italian politician.

Borgna ran as an independent for the office of Mayor of Cuneo at the 2012 Italian local elections, supported by a centre-left coalition. He won and took office on 23 May 2012. He was re-elected for a second term on 16 June 2017.

He was elected President of the Province of Cuneo on 13 October 2014 and re-elected on 1 November 2018.

Borgna has been the first blind mayor of an Italian provincial capital and president of an Italian province.

See also
2012 Italian local elections
2017 Italian local elections
List of mayors of Cuneo

References

External links
 

1973 births
Living people
Blind politicians
Mayors of Cuneo
People from Cuneo
Presidents of the Province of Cuneo